Battle of Mukalla may refer to:

Battle of Mukalla (2015)
Battle of Mukalla (2016)